Han Zaifen (born 20 March 1968) is a Chinese performer of Huangmei opera who is widely regarded as a Huangmei opera superstar. She is the only Huangmei opera artist to have won the prestigious Plum Blossom Award twice. She performed on CCTV Spring Festival Gala a total of 7 times. She also starred in some non-musical TV series.

Biography
Han was born in Qianshan, Anqing, Anhui province in 1968.

Filmography

References

1968 births
Huangmei opera actresses
Living people
People from Qianshan, Anhui
Singers from Anhui
20th-century Chinese actresses
21st-century Chinese actresses
Actresses from Anhui
20th-century Chinese women singers
21st-century Chinese women singers